In enzymology, a peptidylglycine monooxygenase is an enzyme that catalyzes the chemical reaction

peptidylglycine + ascorbate + O2  peptidyl(2-hydroxyglycine) + dehydroascorbate + H2O

The 3 substrates of this enzyme are peptidylglycine, ascorbate, and O2, whereas its 3 products are peptidyl(2-hydroxyglycine), dehydroascorbate, and H2O.

This enzyme belongs to the family of oxidoreductases, specifically those acting on paired donors, with O2 as oxidant and incorporation or reduction of oxygen. The oxygen incorporated need not be derived from O2 with reduced ascorbate as one donor, and incorporation of one atom of oxygen into the other donor. It employs one cofactor, copper.

Structural studies

References

 
 
 
 
 
 

EC 1.14.17
Copper enzymes
Enzymes of known structure